This is a list of birds of the Indiana Dunes.

From the barren sand beaches to the inter-dunal ponds and the intervening forest, this area is inhabited by 271 identified species of birds.

Because the area forms part of the Mississippi Flyway, many more species of birds can be observed there during spring and fall migration times.

Common birds of Indiana Dunes
This is a listing of the most common birds seen in the Indiana Dunes.

Water birds

Birds of prey

Ground birds

Perching birds

Where to see birds
For more details about each habitat type, see Habitats of the Indiana Dunes.

Lake and beachesThere are several points of access to the beaches of Lake Michigan.  From east to west, they are:  Central Avenue; Lakeview (Beverly Shores); Kemil Road Beach (west end of Beverly Shores); Indiana Dunes State Park (admission fee); Cowles Bog Trail ( walk with a climb); West Beach (admission fee); Wells Street Beach (parking fee); Marquette Park; Lake Street Beach.

Dunes
Mt. Baldy (steep climb); Indiana Dunes State Park (admission fee); West Beach (admission fee).

FieldsThe Calumet Bike Trail traverses the length of the park along the South Shore Tracks, with parking at several points, including the Mineal Springs Road, U.S. 12 in the Pines.  The Chellberg Farm off Mineral Springs Road and U.S. 20 has several cultivated fields.

Woods
Indiana Dunes State Park, trails #9 and #10; the Ly-Co-Ki-We horsetrail, U.S. 20; Miller Woods on Lake Street in Gary; and The Bailly/Chellberg trail in Porter

Ponds
Long Lake is easy to reach from West Beach, of Lake/Porter County Line Road.  Miller Woods is dotted with ponds.

Marsh
The Great Marsh stretches from Dune Acres (off Mineral Springs Road, east, to East State Park Road (Kemil Rd).

Swamps
The Restoration of the Great Marsh in Beverly Shores along Beverly drive (east and west of Broadway.  Trail #2 in the State Park traverses a large area of swamp.

Conifers, wooded edgesThese are most difficult as they are scattered throughout the other habitats and do not dominate any single area.

See also
Indiana Dunes National Park
Indiana Dunes State Park

References

Further reading
Brock, Kenneth & Helen Dancey; Birds of the Indiana Dunes
Tekiela, Stan; Birds of Indiana, Field Guide; Adventure Publications; Cambridge, Minnesota; 2000

Indiana Dunes
Birds
Indiana Dunes National Park
Lake County, Indiana